Lissauer is a German surname. Notable people with the surname include:

Abraham Lissauer (1832–1908), Polish-German physician and archaeologist
Ernst Lissauer (1882–1937), German poet and dramatist
Heinrich Lissauer (1861–1891), Prussian-German neurologist
Jack J. Lissauer, American research scientist
Robert Lissauer (1917–2004), American composer, author, and musicologist
Trevor Lissauer (born 1973), American actor and musician
Walter Lissauer (1882–1965), German-American member of the Early Birds of Aviation
Woody Lissauer (born 1959), musician and producer best known for his work with the band Cubic Feet

German-language surnames